Steve Daniar (born 18 July 1955) is a Canadian former wrestler. He competed in the men's freestyle 100 kg at the 1976 Summer Olympics.

References

External links
 

1955 births
Living people
Canadian male sport wrestlers
Olympic wrestlers of Canada
Wrestlers at the 1976 Summer Olympics
Sportspeople from Thunder Bay
Pan American Games medalists in wrestling
Pan American Games bronze medalists for Canada
Wrestlers at the 1979 Pan American Games
Medalists at the 1979 Pan American Games
Commonwealth Games medallists in wrestling
Commonwealth Games gold medallists for Canada
Wrestlers at the 1978 Commonwealth Games
21st-century Canadian people
20th-century Canadian people
Medallists at the 1978 Commonwealth Games